The Judo competition in the 1995 Summer Universiade were held in Fukuoka, Japan from 24 August to 28 August 1995.

Medal overview

Men's event

Women's event

Results overview

Men's event

60 kg

65 kg

71 kg

78 kg

86 kg

95 kg

+95 kg

Open class

Women's event

48 kg

52 kg

56 kg

61 kg

66 kg

72 kg

+72 kg

Open class

Medal table

External links
 
 The Organizing Committee for the Universiade 1995, Fukuoka(FUOC)

Universiade
1995
1995 Summer Universiade
Universiade 1995